Michael Prus (born 4 February 1968) is a German football coach and former player, who played as a defender.

References

1968 births
Living people
People from Rheine
Sportspeople from Münster (region)
German footballers
Association football defenders
German football managers
FC Schalke 04 players
SV Meppen players
SV Eintracht Trier 05 players
Bundesliga players
2. Bundesliga players
Footballers from North Rhine-Westphalia
FC Eintracht Rheine players